Timothy Jervis Gorringe (born 1946) is an English Anglican priest and theologian who is St Luke's Professor of Theological Studies at the University of Exeter, Devon, England.

Life
Born in 1946, Timothy Gorringe was educated at St Edmund Hall, Oxford (BA 1969, MPhil 1975), and Sarum Theological College (1969–1972). He was ordained deacon in 1972 and priest in 1973 and served as Assistant Curate at Chapel Allerton (1972–1975) and Oxford St Mary the Virgin with St Cross and St Peter (1976–1978). From 1979 until 1986, he taught theology at Tamilnadu Theological Seminary. He was Official Fellow, Chaplain, and Tutor in Theology at St John's College, Oxford, 1986–1995, Reader in Contextual Theology in the University of St Andrews 1995–1998, and became St Luke's Professor of Theological Studies in the University of Exeter in 1998.

His academic interests focus on the interrelations of theology, culture, art, social science, criminal justice, economics, and politics, as well as the theology of Karl Barth. He is a member of the Iona Community.

His other interests include apiculture, poultry keeping, home winemaking, the theatre, poetry, and political activism.

Currently Gorringe is working on a two-year research project funded by the Arts and Humanities Research Council on "The values of constructive social change" focusing on the transition town movement.

Publications
Gorringe has published many books:

Redeeming Time: Atonement Through Education (Darton Longman Todd, 1986)
Discerning Spirit: A Theology of Revelation (SCM, 1990)
God's Theatre: A Theology of Providence (SCM, 1991)
Capital and the Kingdom: Theological Ethics and Economic Order (Orbis Books, 1994)
Alan Ecclestone: Priest as Revolutionary (Cairns, 1994)
God's Just Vengeance: Crime, Violence and the Rhetoric of Salvation (CUP, 1996)
The Sign of Love: Reflections on the Eucharist (SPCK 1997)
Karl Barth: Against Hegemony (OUP, 1999)
Fair Shares: Ethics and the Global Economy (Thames & Hudson, 1999)
Salvation (Epworth, 2000)
The Education of Desire: Towards a Theology of the Senses (SCM, 2001)
A Theology of the Built Environment: Justice, Empowerment, Redemption (CUP, 2002)
Furthering Humanity: A Theology of Culture (Ashgate, 2004) (shortlisted for the Michael Ramsey Prize 2005)
Crime (SCM, 2004)
Harvest: Food, Farming and the Churches (SPCK, 2006)
The Common Good and the Global Emergency: God and the Built Environment (CUP, 2011)
Earthly Visions: Theology and the Challenges of Art (Yale, 2011)
Word, Silence, and the Climate Emergency: God, Ekklesia, and Christian Doctrine (Fortress Academic, 2021)

References

External links
 Professor Tim Gorringe: Emeritus Professor of Theological Studies home page

1946 births
20th-century Anglican theologians
20th-century Church of England clergy
20th-century English Anglican priests
20th-century English theologians
21st-century Anglican theologians
21st-century Church of England clergy
21st-century English Anglican priests
21st-century English theologians
Academics of the University of Exeter
Academics of the University of St Andrews
Alumni of St Edmund Hall, Oxford
Anglican socialists
Christianity and environmentalism
Church of England priests
College chaplains of the University of Oxford
English Anglican theologians
English Christian socialists
Fellows of St John's College, Oxford
Iona Community members
Living people
Academic staff of Tamil Nadu Theological Seminary